Rt. Hon. William Grant (6 April 1883 – 15 August 1949) was a Unionist politician in Northern Ireland.

Born at 110 Earl Street in Belfast, son of linen worker Martin Grant and Mary Ann Gibson, Grant worked as a shipwright and was a founder member of the Ulster Unionist Labour Association.  He was also a founder member of the Ulster Volunteers.  He was elected to the Northern Ireland House of Commons as an Ulster Unionist Party member for Belfast North in 1929, then winning Belfast Duncairn in 1929, holding this until his death.

Grant became Parliamentary Secretary to the Ministry of Labour in 1938, then Minister of Public Security in 1941.  As a cabinet post, this carried with it membership of the Privy Council of Northern Ireland.  He was then appointed Minister of Labour from 1943 until 1944 and briefly in 1945, and also served as Minister of Health and Local Government from 1944 until his death.

References
https://www.irishtimes.com/culture/books/hearthlands-review-clear-eyed-meticulous-belfast-social-history-1.3349922

1883 births
1949 deaths
Members of the House of Commons of Northern Ireland 1921–1925
Members of the House of Commons of Northern Ireland 1925–1929
Members of the House of Commons of Northern Ireland 1929–1933
Members of the House of Commons of Northern Ireland 1933–1938
Members of the House of Commons of Northern Ireland 1938–1945
Members of the House of Commons of Northern Ireland 1945–1949
Members of the House of Commons of Northern Ireland 1949–1953
Northern Ireland Cabinet ministers (Parliament of Northern Ireland)
Northern Ireland junior government ministers (Parliament of Northern Ireland)
Members of the Privy Council of Northern Ireland
Ulster Unionist Party members of the House of Commons of Northern Ireland
British shipwrights
Members of the House of Commons of Northern Ireland for Belfast constituencies